Lundby is a small railway town, with a population of 843 (1 January 2022), located in Vordingborg Municipality in the southern part of Zealand, Denmark. Lundby Efterskole is located here.

Lundby Station serves the Sydbanen line, with hourly departures towards Copenhagen.

References 

Cities and towns in Region Zealand
Vordingborg Municipality